Stephen Henderson (born 2 January 1966) is an Irish football coach and former player who played as a goalkeeper. He is currently manager of League of Ireland First Division side Longford Town.

Personal life
Stephen comes from a goalkeeping family. His father, Paddy, was a League of Ireland goalkeeper, as was his brother Dave. His younger brother Wayne was a Republic of Ireland international goalkeeper and Stephen's son, Stephen, has made over 200 appearances at club level in England

Career
Following a long playing career that started at Shelbourne in 1984 and included Dundalk, Limerick, Lisburn Distillery, St James's Gate, Cobh Ramblers, Ards and Finn Harps, Henderson spent four years as the goalkeeping coach at Cork City.

Between 1996 and 2000 Henderson played a total of 117 games for Ards which included 2 appearances in the 1997 UEFA Intertoto Cup, 91 in the Irish Football League.

However, when the manager's job at neighbouring Cobh Ramblers became available in 2004 he became the first member of his family to become a senior manager. He made his managerial bow at Finn Park on 4 September. He guided the club to third place in the First Division table in 2005, their highest league placing since 1999, and fourth place the following season before delivering the club their first ever piece of silverware when he guided Cobh Ramblers to the First Division title in 2007.
Cobh were relegated in 2008 from the Premier Division and Henderson took up the manager's post at Waterford United in December 2008.

He led the club to the final of the League Cup and the semi-finals of the FAI Cup in 2009, and to the promotion play-offs the following season. However, after an indifferent start to the following season, in May 2011 Henderson was sacked by the Blues.

In October 2015, he re-joined Cobh Ramblers on new three-year contract and the following season he guided Ramblers to Munster Senior Cup victory and a third-place league finish. Ramblers reached the final of the EA Sports Cup in 2018 when they lost 3-1 to Derry City in a game played in Derry. With the side struggling in the league, Henderson left Cobh in June 2019. He immediately became Head of Youth Development at Shelbourne in a position he held until April 2021.

On 24 November 2022, Henderson made his return to first-team management when he was appointed manager of Longford Town.

Honours

As a manager
Cobh Ramblers
League of Ireland First Division (1): 2007
Munster Senior Cup 2016

References

External links

1966 births
Living people
Association footballers from County Dublin
Republic of Ireland association footballers
League of Ireland players
Association football goalkeepers
Shelbourne F.C. players
Dundalk F.C. players
Limerick F.C. players
Lisburn Distillery F.C. players
Cobh Ramblers F.C. players
Ards F.C. players
Finn Harps F.C. players
Waterford F.C. managers
NIFL Premiership players
Stella Maris F.C. players
St James's Gate F.C. players
Republic of Ireland football managers
Step